Utoy Creek is a stream in the U.S. state of Georgia. It is a tributary to the Chattahoochee River.

Utoy Creek most likely was named for the Utoy Indians. The Battle of Utoy Creek was fought here in 1864.

References

Rivers of Georgia (U.S. state)
Rivers of Fulton County, Georgia